Rhodochiton nubicola is a climbing or sprawling herbaceous perennial native to the state of Chiapas in Mexico and to Guatemala, where it grows in cloud forests at between . It has dangling flowers, with a bell-shaped calyx and dark purple petals forming a tube. Unlike the better known Rhodochiton atrosanguineus, the petal tube is asymmetrical with two "lips".

The species was first described by Wayne J. Elisens in 1985. It was transferred from the genus Lophospermum to Rhodochiton by David A. Sutton in 1988.

References

Plantaginaceae
Plants described in 1985